This is a list of winners and nominees of the Golden Horse Award for Best Supporting Actor.

Superlatives

Multiple wins and nominations
The following individuals received two or more Best Supporting Actor awards:

The following individuals received three or more Best Supporting Actor nominations:

Winners and nominees

1960s

1970s

1980s

1990s

2000s

2010s

2020s

References

External links 
 Official website 
 Official website 

Golden Horse Film Awards
Film awards for supporting actor